The Innocent is a two-part British television crime drama miniseries, written by Jan McVerry and Stephen Mallatratt, that first broadcast on ITV on 7 January 2001. Directed by Sarah Harding, The Innocent tells the story of David Pastorov (Paul Rhys), a barrister accused of rape by one of his colleagues, Alison (Clare Holman). Although he initially denies the claims, when it later transpires that he slept with the alleged victim, his wife, Beth (Caroline Quentin), heavily pregnant with the couple's third child, struggles to believe his version of events.

The two episodes of The Innocent attracted 9.87 and 9.49 million viewers respectively. Despite going head-to-head with Rebel Heart, the BBC's controversial Irish War of Independence drama, which had attracted widespread criticism before its broadcast (which resulted in critics expecting it to draw a large audience), The Innocent drew nearly six million more viewers. Despite this, the series has never been released on DVD.

Reception
Gareth McLean of The Guardian was slightly more critical, writing; "On paper - or in the Radio Times, at least - The Innocent hardly seemed like brave new drama. Focusing as it did on a schism between best friends, the subjectiveness of truth, and the compromises made and little lies told to live one's life, it appeared to be another off-the-peg contemporary drama. And with the misogyny of the legal system, the choices women have to make, and the loveliness of everyone's house thrown in, you could have been forgiven for not even turning on."

Cast
 Caroline Quentin as Beth Pastorov
 Paul Rhys as David Pastorov
 Clare Holman as Alison Huntley
 Peter O'Brien as Paul Huntley
 Michael Cochrane as Harold Haig
 Ben Miles as Brian Percival
 David Fleeshman as Gareth Lloyd
 Nicholas Fry as Simon Lang
 Eleanor Lloyd-Davies as Scarlett Pastorov
 Jack Lloyd-Davies as Luke Pastorov
 Nathaniel Burrage-Light as Oliver Pastorov
 Susan Cookson as DC Morgan
 Joe Chadwin as Tom Huntley
 Madeleine Eglin as Annie Huntley
 John Griffin as Maurice Horovitch
 Andrew Scarborough as Mark Latimer

References

External links

ITV television dramas
2001 British television series debuts
2001 British television series endings
2000s British drama television series
English-language television shows